is a town located in Kani District, Gifu Prefecture, Japan. , the town had an estimated population of 18,363 and a population density of 330 persons per km2, in 7,348 households.

Geography
Mitake is located at the edge of the Nōbi Plain in south-central Gifu Prefecture.  The Kiso River runs through the town. The town has a climate characterized by characterized by hot and humid summers, and mild winters  (Köppen climate classification Cfa).  The average annual temperature in Mitake is 14.9 °C. The average annual rainfall is 1986 mm with September as the wettest month. The temperatures are highest on average in August, at around 27.5 °C, and lowest in January, at around 3.0 °C.

Neighbouring municipalities
Gifu Prefecture
Kani
Minokamo
Toki
Mizunami
Yaotsu

Demographics
Per Japanese census data, the population of Mitake peaked around the year 2000 and has declined slightly since.

History
The area around Mitake was part of traditional Mino Province. During the Edo period, Fushimi-juku and Mitake-juku prospered as post stations on the Nakasendō highway connecting Edo with Kyoto. During the post-Meiji restoration cadastral reforms, the area was organised into Kani District, Gifu Prefecture. The town of Mitake was formed in 1889 with the establishment of the modern municipalities system. On February 1, 1955, Mitake absorbed the neighbouring towns on Fushimi and Naka, and the village of Kaminogo.

Economy
Mitake was once a major producing area of lignite coal, with more than 100 coal mines operating during its peak around 1947, producing more than a quarter of the nation's output; however by 1968 the last mines closed. Land subsidence is now a growing problem in the town.

Education
Mitake has three public elementary schools and three public middle school operated by the town government and one public junior high school operated by neighbouring Kani city. The town has two public high schools operated by the Gifu Prefectural Board of Education.

Transportation

Railway
 Meitetsu - Hiromi Line 
  -  -

Highway
The town is not located on any national highways.

References

External links

Mitake official website 

 
Towns in Gifu Prefecture